Paruvathanahalli is a Village Panchayat in Pennagaram taluk, Dharmapuri, Tamil Nadu, India.

References
List of Village Panchayats in Tamil Nadu

Villages in Dharmapuri district